Tonino Viali (born 16 September 1960) is a retired Italian middle distance runner who specialized in the 800 metres.

Achievements

National titles
Tonino Viali has won 10 times the individual national championship.
4 wins in 800 metres (1987, 1989, 1990, 1991)
1 win in 1500 metres (1994)
4 wins in 800 metres indoor (1986, 1987, 1988, 1992)
1 win in 1500 metres indoor (1989)

See also
 800 metres winners of Italian Athletics Championships
 1500 metres winners of Italian Athletics Championships

References

External links
 

1960 births
Living people
Italian male middle-distance runners
Athletes (track and field) at the 1988 Summer Olympics
Olympic athletes of Italy
Athletics competitors of Fiamme Oro
Mediterranean Games bronze medalists for Italy
Athletes (track and field) at the 1991 Mediterranean Games
Mediterranean Games medalists in athletics
World Athletics Indoor Championships medalists